Matthew Frattin (born January 3, 1988) is a Canadian professional ice hockey right winger who is currently playing with HC Bolzano in the ICE Hockey League (ICEHL). He began his NHL career with the Toronto Maple Leafs, the organization that drafted him 99th overall in 2007. Frattin also played in the NHL for the Los Angeles Kings and Columbus Blue Jackets before rejoining Toronto in 2014 via a trade. Frattin spent a further season and a half in the Maple Leafs organization before being included in a nine-player trade with the Ottawa Senators.

At the end of his senior season of college ice hockey with the University of North Dakota, in 2010–11, Frattin was honored as the Western Collegiate Hockey Association (WCHA) Player of the Year, also being named a Hobey Baker Award finalist.

Playing career

Amateur
Frattin was born in Edmonton, Alberta. As a youth, he played in the 2001 Quebec International Pee-Wee Hockey Tournament with the North West Hawks minor ice hockey team from Edmonton.

He played junior hockey for the Fort Saskatchewan Traders of the Alberta Junior Hockey League (AJHL) during the 2006–07 season. After playing junior A ice hockey in Alberta, he was then selected by the Toronto Maple Leafs in the fourth round, 99th overall, of the 2007 NHL Entry Draft. He then enrolled at the University of North Dakota in 2007.

Frattin scored a key goal in North Dakota's playoff victory over rivals the University of Minnesota in the 2010 Western Collegiate Hockey Association (WCHA) playoffs. At the beginning of the 2010–11 season, Frattin won the team's fitness competition after working out extensively during the off-season. In 2010, he also made headlines after the WCHA suspended him for one game due to a hit that he delivered against a Minnesota player.

In the 2010–11 season, Frattin had a highly-productive offensive year, leading the entire NCAA Men's Division I in goal-scoring, with 36, a total eclipsing his combined total from his first three collegiate years combined. His 36 goals was the third-highest single season total in Division I college hockey in the previous ten years, and the most since the University of Minnesota's Ryan Potulny scored 38 in the 2005–06 season. Frattin also set separate eight- and nine-game goal-scoring streaks during the season. He played a key role in North Dakota's success in the playoffs, scoring two game-winning goals in the WCHA playoffs en route to a Frozen Four appearance. At the end of the season, Frattin was named WCHA Player of the Year and was selected as a Hobey Baker Award finalist.

Professional
On April 8, 2011, at the end of the WCHA season, Frattin signed a two-year, entry-level contract with the Toronto Maple Leafs. He played in his first career NHL game the very next day, on April 9. His first career NHL goal was scored in the 2011–12 season on November 19, 2011, against goaltender Tomáš Vokoun of the Washington Capitals.

On July 1, 2012, Toronto signed Frattin to a two-year contract extension. On June 23, 2013, Frattin was traded to the Los Angeles Kings, along with goaltender Ben Scrivens and a conditional second-round draft pick, in exchange for goaltender Jonathan Bernier. On March 5, 2014, Frattin was again traded, this time to the Columbus Blue Jackets, along with a second-round pick and a conditional third-round pick, in exchange for All-Star Marián Gáborík.

After 4 games in Columbus, Frattin was then traded from the Blue Jackets back to the Maple Leafs on July 1, 2014, in exchange for Jerry D'Amigo and 2015 conditional seventh-round draft pick. He was then immediately signed to a two-year contract extension by Toronto.

Frattin spent most of his next two seasons in the AHL with the Marlies. In the 15–16 season, Frattin lost ice time to young players such as William Nylander and Connor Brown, but still produced in his limited role. On February 9, 2016, Frattin was included in a blockbuster nine-player deal that focused around Dion Phaneuf moving to the Ottawa Senators. It was the third time Frattin had been involved in a trade with the Maple Leafs in as many years.  Frattin was loaned back to the Marlies the following day by the Senators to finish the season.

As a free agent from the Senators, Frattin opted to continue his career in the AHL, signing a one-year deal with the Stockton Heat, an affiliate of the Calgary Flames on September 1, 2016. On July 18, 2017, it was reported that Frattin had signed with Beijing's HC Kunlun Red Star, the only KHL team based in China. However it was later confirmed to have fallen through as he signed with fellow KHL club, Barys Astana, on August 23, 2017.

After two stints with Barys, Frattin as a free agent continued his tenure in the KHL, agreeing to a one-year contract with Ak Bars Kazan on May 4, 2019. In the following 2019–20 season, Frattin played among the club's top nine forwards, registering 8 goals and 28 points in 56 regular season games. He added 5 points in their first-round series sweep over HC Neftekhimik Nizhnekamsk before the remainder of the playoffs were cancelled due to the COVID-19 pandemic.

As a free agent, Frattin made a familiar return to Barys Nur-Sultan, agreeing to a one-year contract for his third stint with the club on May 19, 2020.

Career statistics

Awards and honours

References

External links

 

1988 births
Living people
AHCA Division I men's ice hockey All-Americans
Ak Bars Kazan players
Barys Nur-Sultan players
Bolzano HC players
Canadian ice hockey forwards
Canadian people of Italian descent
Columbus Blue Jackets players
Fort Saskatchewan Traders players
Lausanne HC players
Los Angeles Kings players
North Dakota Fighting Hawks men's ice hockey players
Ice hockey people from Edmonton
Stockton Heat players
Toronto Maple Leafs draft picks
Toronto Maple Leafs players
Toronto Marlies players